Mejlby is a town in Aarhus Municipality, Central Denmark Region in Denmark with a population of 409 (1 January 2022). Mejlby is situated the northern section of Aarhus Municipality, 20 kilometers from the city of Aarhus. The closest towns are Hårup, one kilometer to the south, Lystrup five kilometers to the south and Spørring three kilometers to the west. E45 passes by six kilometers to the west of the town.

References

Towns and settlements in Aarhus Municipality
Cities and towns in Aarhus Municipality